Radišani is a settlement in the municipality of Butel, North Macedonia. It is also known as a village / "Skopjansko selo" and it used to be part of  Čair Municipality.

Demographics
According to the 1467-68 Ottoman defter, Radišani appears as being inhabited by an Orthodox Albanian population. Due to Slavicisation, some families had a mixed Slav-Albanian anthroponomy - usually a Slavic first name and an Albanian last name or last names with Albanian patronyms and Slavic suffixes. 

The names are: Gjura Arbanas (t.Arnaut), Oliver son of Kolja, Stajo son of Stan-ko, Petro son of Krista, Dosa son of Span, Dan-o his brother, Todor son of Dragush, Nikola Arbanas, Pejo his son, Stepan son of Rajka, Marin his brother, Nikola Kumar.

In statistics gathered by Vasil Kanchov in 1900 showed that 140 Bulgarian Exarchists and 50 Muslim Albanians inhabited Radišani.

According to the 2021 census, the settlement had a total of 6.066 inhabitants. Ethnic groups in the village include:

Macedonians 4.904
Serbs 204
Albanians 216
Romani 138
Vlachs 12
Bosniaks 103
Turks 27
Others 462

References

External links

Villages in Butel Municipality
Albanian communities in North Macedonia